Ocean Flame is a 2008 Hong Kong romantic comedy film directed by Liu Fendou and starring Liao Fan and Monica Mok. The plot is based on Wang Shuo's novel of the same title. It was released on 11 September 2008.

Plot
The film tells the story of a punk's entanglements with a pure young girl.

Cast

Main cast
 Liao Fan as Wang Yao
 Monica Mok as Li Chuan

Other cast
 Hee Ching Paw as Li Chuan's mother
 Simon Yam as Laozhang
 Derek Tsang as Third Brother's assistant
 Suet Lam as Gunzi
 Wong Man Shing as Gunzi's assistant
 Him Law as Li Chuan's brother
 Hui Siu Hung as Mr. Luo
 Ha Da as Lü Yan
 Ma Gaoqiang as a whoremaster
 Zhao Huinan as Wei Ning
 Lawrence Cheng as a whoremaster
 Hai Yitian as Zheng Zhong
 Ka-Yan Leung as Third Brother
 Zhou Chuchu as Xiaobai
 Koo Fung as Waiter

Reception
The film earned critical acclaim and received nominations at the 45th Golden Horse Awards. The film also was shortlisted for the 61st Cannes Film Festival and the 33rd Toronto International Film Festival.

Nominations and awards

References

External links

2008 films
2000s Mandarin-language films
2000s Cantonese-language films
Films based on Chinese novels
Hong Kong romantic comedy films
2008 romantic comedy films
2000s Hong Kong films